The Men's 50 metre backstroke event at the 2010 Commonwealth Games took place on 4 and 5 October 2010, at the SPM Swimming Pool Complex.

Four heats were held, with most containing the maximum number of swimmers (eight). The top sixteen times qualified for the semi-finals and, the top eight from there qualified for the finals.

Heats

Semifinals

Final

References

Aquatics at the 2010 Commonwealth Games